Aykut Sunay Ramadan (born 10 July 1998) is a Bulgarian footballer who plays as a forward for Septemvri Sofia.

Career
Ramadan joined CSKA Sofia academy in 2006. In 2015 he moved to Litex Lovech, just to return in CSKA in January 2016.

In December 2018 he was announced as the new player of CSKA 1948. In July 2020, despite being announced as Minyor Pernik new arrival, he later signed with Sportist Svoge.

On 27 May 2021 he signed a contract with Septemvri Sofia. Ramadan had a crucial role in the team that won promotion to First League in 2022.

References

External links
 

Living people
1998 births
Bulgarian footballers
Bulgaria youth international footballers
PFC CSKA Sofia players
PFC Litex Lovech players
FC Tsarsko Selo Sofia players
PFC Minyor Pernik players
FC Montana players
FC CSKA 1948 Sofia players
FC Lokomotiv Gorna Oryahovitsa players
FC Sportist Svoge players
FC Septemvri Sofia players
First Professional Football League (Bulgaria) players
Association football forwards